Julius Eskelund Beck (born 27 April 2005) is a Danish professional footballer who plays for Italian  club Spezia as a midfielder.

Career

SønderjyskE
Beck is a product of SønderjyskE, where he spent his whole youth career. He played his way through the youth section. In January 2021, 15-year old Beck played in a friendly game for SønderjyskE's first team against AC Horsens, where he also scored.

On 9 May 2021, 16-year old Beck got his official debut for SønderjyskE in the Danish Superliga against Vejle Boldklub, where he became the supremely youngest player who has ever represented SønderjyskE in the Danish Superliga as well as the third youngest Danish Superliga debutant ever. Beck started on the bench, but came on the pitch after the half time. Beck made a total of three league appearances in the 2020/21 season.

Spezia
On 31 August 2021, SønderjyskE sold Julis Beck to Italian club Spezia, a club that had the same owners as SønderjyskE. On 28 August 2022, 17-year old Beck was called up to his first Serie A game for Spezia. He remained on the bench for the whole game. He got his Serie A-debut on 2 October 2022 in a 0-4 defeat against Lazio.

Personal life
Julius Beck is the son of former Danish footballer, Henrik Beck, born in 1974. Beck signed a deal until June 2024 and started on the clubs U-19 team.

References

External links

Julius Beck at DBU

2005 births
Living people
Danish men's footballers
Danish expatriate men's footballers
Association football midfielders
Denmark youth international footballers
People from Haderslev Municipality
Sportspeople from the Region of Southern Denmark
SønderjyskE Fodbold players
Spezia Calcio players
Danish Superliga players
Serie A players
Danish expatriate sportspeople in Italy
Expatriate footballers in Italy